Amphibole Peak is the highest peak in the Gabbro Hills, with an elevation of . It was given its name by the Southern Party of the New Zealand Geological Survey Antarctic Expedition (1963–64), because minerals of the Amphibole group were found on the peak.

References 

Mountains of the Ross Dependency
Dufek Coast